Science and Religion: Some Historical Perspectives is a book on the relationship between religion and science by John Hedley Brooke.

The book identifies three traditional views of the relationship between science and religion found in historical analyses: conflict, complementarity, and commonality.  The book portrays all three as oversimplifications. It offers up the alternative notion of complexity, which bases the relationship between science and religion on changing circumstances where it is defined upon each particular historical situation and the actual beliefs and ideas of the scientific and religious figures involved.

Reception
American Historical Review states that the book's bibliographic essay "identifies and … incorporates the results of virtually every significant and relevant article published in the past fifty years."

References

Further reading

List of reviews

1991 non-fiction books
Science books
Religious studies books
Books about religion and science
Cambridge University Press books